Lyudmyla and Nadiya Kichenok were the defending champions, having won the event in 2012, but they lost in the quarterfinals.

Yuliya Beygelzimer and Renata Voráčová won the tournament, defeating Vesna Dolonc and Alexandra Panova in the final, 6–1, 6–4.

Seeds 

  Vesna Dolonc /  Alexandra Panova (final)
  Yuliya Beygelzimer /  Renata Voráčová (champions)
  Lyudmyla Kichenok /  Nadiya Kichenok (quarterfinals)
  Paula Kania /  Polina Pekhova (semifinals)

Draw

References 
 Draw

Viccourt Cup - Doubles
Viccourt Cup
Viccourt Cup - Doubles